Ceolwulf, occasionally spelt Ceolwulph, may refer to:

Ceolwulf I of Mercia, King of Mercia
Ceolwulf II of Mercia, King of Mercia
Ceolwulf of Northumbria (Saint Ceolwulf), King of Northumbria
Ceolwulf of Wessex, King of Wessex
Ceolulfus, Bishop of Lindsey, also known as Ceolwulf